NDGA may refer to:

 Nordihydroguaiaretic acid, an antioxidant chemical compound
 N.D. Ga., an abbreviation for United States District Court for the Northern District of Georgia